Véronique Barrault (1958 – 3 May 2022) was a French actress.

Biography
Barrault studied at the Atelier international de Théâtre Blanche Salant and was known for her early successes in the theatre. She performed at Le Splendid and the Café de la Gare under the pseudonym "Coquillette". She first appeared on film in French Fried Vacation 2, directed by Patrice Leconte. She acted alongside the likes of Josiane Balasko, Alain Chabat, and Charlotte Gainsbourg. She spent her final years in the theatre and working as an acting coach.

Barrault was killed in a traffic collision in Gironde on 3 May 2022, at the age of 64.

Filmography

Cinema

Television

References

External links 

1958 births
2022 deaths
20th-century French actresses
21st-century French actresses
French television actresses
French stage actresses
Road incident deaths in France